Hey Ho (What You Do to Me!) is the second studio album by the Canadian rock band The Guess Who. This album is also the last to feature Bob Ashley on keyboards. This album was originally released on Quality Records in 1965.  The cover gave credit to "Chad Allan & the Expressions (Guess Who?)". It is regarded as a garage rock album.

Track listing

Personnel
Chad Allan – lead vocals, rhythm guitar
Randy Bachman – lead guitar, backing vocals
Jim Kale – bass, backing vocals
Garry Peterson – drums
Bob Ashley – keyboards, backing vocals

Charts
Singles

References

1965 albums
The Guess Who albums
Quality Records albums